Carpet beetle may refer to any of several taxa of beetles:

some genera of the Dermestidae, a beetle family, including:
genus Attagenus
black carpet beetle, Attagenus unicolor
brown carpet beetle, Attagenus smirnovi
Attagenus pellio
genus Anthrenus
varied carpet beetle, Anthrenus verbasci
Anthrenus scrophulariae, also known as the common carpet beetle
Anthrenus flavipes (A. flavipes), also known as the furniture carpet beetle

Animal common name disambiguation pages